Notre-Dame d'Auteuil is a Roman Catholic parish church on the Auteuil hill in the 16th arrondissement of Paris.

History
Auteuil was originally a hamlet and commune with its own parish, and it was only in 1860 that it was merged into Paris.  The present church was finished in 1892, having been designed in the Romano-Byzantine style by the architectural practice of Joseph Auguste Émile Vaudremer, the diocesan architect. The church has been called an "unmistakable small-time cousin" of Sacré-Cœur on Monmartre. According to an item that appeared in Ripley's Believe It or Not! in 1955, the church was built as a tribute to Pope Leo XIII, and the tower was intended to resemble his papal tiara.

63m long and rectangular in plan, it has a 50m high spire.  Its organ has 3 manual and pedal keyboards (both electrically powered) and 53 jeux/71 rangs, and is characterised by its high quality, best adapted for Romantic music such as that of Widor or Dupré.  Its original organ, by Aristide Cavaillé-Coll, has been rebuilt in Trocadéro.

Since 1999, the church organist has been Frédéric Blanc.

References

Roman Catholic churches in the 16th arrondissement of Paris
Roman Catholic churches completed in 1892
19th-century Roman Catholic church buildings in France